Enovate may refer to:

 Pentafluoropropane spray foam insulation
 Enovate (marque), a Chinese electric vehicle brand